Chrysoexorista is a genus of flies in the family Tachinidae.

Species
C. dawsoni (Sellers, 1943)
C. fulgoris (Sellers, 1943)
C. lineata (Wulp, 1890)
C. marginata (Aldrich & Webber, 1924)
C. ochracea (Wulp, 1890)

References

Diptera of North America
Exoristinae
Tachinidae genera
Taxa named by Charles Henry Tyler Townsend